"When the Saints Go Marching In", often referred to as simply "The Saints", is a traditional black spiritual. It originated as a Christian hymn, but is often played by jazz bands: this song, indeed, was famously recorded on May 13, 1938, by Louis Armstrong and his orchestra.

The song is sometimes confused with a similarly titled composition: "When the Saints Are Marching In", a song from 1896 by Katharine Purvis (lyrics) and James Milton Black (music).

Origins and usage

The origins of this song are unclear. It apparently evolved in the early 1900s from a number of similarly titled gospel songs, including "When the Saints Are Marching In" (1896) and "When the Saints March In for Crowning" (1908). The first known recorded version was in 1923 by the Paramount Jubilee Singers on Paramount 12073. Although the title given on the label is "When All the Saints Come Marching In", the group sings the modern lyrics beginning with "When the saints go marching in". No author is shown on the label. Several other gospel versions were recorded in the 1920s, with slightly varying titles but using the same lyrics, including versions by The Four Harmony Kings (1924), Elkins-Payne Jubilee Singers (1924), Wheat Street Female Quartet (1925), Bo Weavil Jackson (1926), Deaconess Alexander (1926), Rev. E. D. Campbell (1927), Robert Hicks (AKA Barbecue Bob, 1927), Blind Willie Davis (1928), and the Pace Jubilee Singers (1928). 

The earliest versions were slow and stately, but as time passed, the recordings became more rhythmic, including a distinctly up-tempo version by the Sanctified Singers on British Parlophone in 1931.

Even though the song had folk roots, a number of composers claimed copyright in it in later years, including Luther G. Presley and Virgil Oliver Stamps, R. E. Winsett. The tune is particularly associated with the city of New Orleans. A jazz standard, it has been recorded by many jazz and pop artists.

Lyrics
As with many numbers with long traditional folk use, there is no one "official" version of the song or its lyrics. This extends so far as confusion as to its name, with it often being mistakenly called "When the Saints Come Marching In". As for the lyrics themselves, their very simplicity makes it easy to generate new verses. Since the first and second lines of a verse are exactly the same, and the third and fourth are standard throughout, the creation of one suitable line in iambic tetrameter generates an entire verse.

It is impossible to list every version of the song, but a common standard version runs:

Often the first two words of the common third verse line ("Lord, how I want...") are sung as either "Oh how", "Oh, Lord" or even "Lord, Lord" as cue notes to the simple melody at each third line.

Arrangements vary considerably. The simplest is just an endless repetition of the chorus. Verses may be alternated with choruses, or put in the third of four repetitions to create an AABA form with the verse as the bridge.

Some traditional arrangements often have ensemble rather than individual vocals. It is also common as an audience sing-along number. Versions using call and response are often heard, e.g.:

 Call: Oh when the Saints
 Response: Oh when the Saints!
The response verses can echo the same melody or form a counterpoint melody, often syncopated opposite the rhythm of the main verses, and a solo singer might sing another counterpoint melody (solo soprano or tenor) as a 3rd part in more complex arrangements.

Analysis of the traditional lyrics
The song is apocalyptic, taking much of its imagery from the Book of Revelation, but excluding its more horrific depictions of the Last Judgment. The verses about the Sun and Moon are often interpreted as Solar and Lunar eclipses; the trumpet is the way in which the Last Judgment is announced. As the hymn expresses the wish to go to Heaven, picturing the saints going in (through the Pearly Gates), it is entirely appropriate for funerals.

Bill Haley & His Comets version

Bill Haley & His Comets recorded a rock and roll version of the song titled "The Saints Rock 'N' Roll". Bill Haley started the song, which he learned through his mother, with the line "Rocking and rolling all the way". The song was recorded on 23 September 1955, and released in March 1956 backed with "R-O-C-K" on Decca Records. It reached No. 18 on Billboard's  Best Sellers chart, and No. 5 in the UK chart.
A version of the song was included in the soundtrack of the 1956 film Rock, Pretty Baby.

Charts

Other versions

As gospel hymn
 First recorded by the Paramount Jubilee Singers on Paramount 12073, mid-November 1923. This group may be related to the Elkins-Payne Jubilee Singers.
 Four Harmony Kings, Vocalion 14941, mid-November 1924.
 Elkins-Payne Jubilee Singers, Okeh 8170. .
 Bo Weavil Jackson,  in Chicago, IL, under the title "When the Saints Come Marching Home", Paramount 12390.
 Recorded by bluesman Sleepy John Estes accompanied by second guitar and kazoo for Bluebird Records in Chicago, 1941.
 This song is available in the Elvis Presley compilation Peace in the Valley: The Complete Gospel Recordings. Sony BMG/Elvis Music

With traditional lyrics
 Louis Armstrong helped make The Saints into a jazz standard with his 1938 Decca recording, which was added to the National Recording Registry by the Library of Congress in 2021.
 The tune was brought into the early rock and roll repertory by Fats Domino as one of the traditional New Orleans numbers he often played to rock audiences. Domino would usually use "The Saints" as his grand finale number, sometimes with his horn players leaving the stage to parade through the theater aisles or around the dance floor.
 Judy Garland sang it in her own pop style.
 Connee Boswell recorded the number with the Original Memphis Five in 1957. 
 Elvis Presley performed the song during the Million Dollar Quartet jam session and also recorded a version for his film, Frankie and Johnny.
 Bing Crosby included the song in a medley on his album 101 Gang Songs (1961)
 Other early rock artists to follow Domino's lead included Jerry Lee Lewis.
 Donna Hightower recorded the song in 1962 for Barclay Records as a swinging Twist number, complete with a scat vocal and imitation of Louis Armstrong. 
 The Kidsongs Kids sang this song at the end of their "Day At Camp" video.
 In 1990, John Rutter arranged a lively version of the song for the Cambridge Singers, piano or organ accompaniment, and a Dixieland jazz-style clarinet obbligato.
 Etta James performed the song during the 1984 Summer Olympics opening ceremony.

With non-traditional lyrics
 Louis Armstrong and Danny Kaye performed a comedy duet version in the 1959 film The Five Pennies, naming composers and musicians who would play "on the day that the saints go marching in".
 Woody Guthrie sang a song called "When The Yanks Go Marching In" in 1943.*(The Weaver's) at Carnegie Hall track 16.1955 VMD-73101.
 Tony Sheridan made a successful rock and roll arrangement of the song which he recorded in 1961 with the then-unknown band The Beatles as a backing group, significantly deviating some verses from the original lyrics. It was originally released as the B-side of a single coupled with "My Bonnie".
 In 1983, Aaron Neville, along with New Orleans musicians Sal and Steve Monistere and Carlo Nuccio and a group of players for the New Orleans Saints American football team, recorded a popular version of the song incorporating the team's "Who Dat?" chant.
 A version was released by John Edmond on his album "All Time Rhodesian Evergreens" entitled "The Saints" with additional verses about soldiers going on parade, doing fire force, among other things.

As football chants
"When the Saints Go Marching In" is frequently sung as football chants by fans during association football matches and also rugby league (particularly by fans of St Helens RLFC), often with the name or nickname of the team in place of the word "saints". Examples include "When the Saints Go Marching In" (St Mirren F.C., Southampton F.C., St Albans City F.C., and St Patrick's Athletic F.C.), "When the Reds Go Marching In (Liverpool FC)", "When the Posh Go Steaming In" (Peterborough United F.C.), "When the Spurs Go Marching In" or "When the Stripes Go Marching In" (Tottenham Hotspur), and "When the Blues Go Steaming In" (Chelsea FC and Bengaluru FC), “Oh when the beans come oot the tin”. Liverpool fans may have been introduced the chant when they used it for their star player Ian St John in the 1960s. However, Southampton fans claimed to have used it in the 1950s.

A version with edited lyrics is used as the club song for the St Kilda Football Club that compete in the Australian Football League.

Instrumental
 Bunk Johnson's Band recorded an instrumental version on August 2, 1944.
Big Chief Jazzband recorded the tune in Oslo on May 10, 1953. It was released on the 78 rpm record by His Master's Voice.
 Al Hirt released a version on his 1963 album, Our Man in New Orleans and was on The Best of Al Hirt.
 Bo Diddley and Chuck Berry released a version on the 1964 album, Two Great Guitars.
 Harry James released a version on his 1972 album Mr. Trumpet. (Longines Symphonette Society)
 It was recorded under the title "Revival" by Johnny and the Hurricanes. The band's management claimed authorship.
 The rhythm of "When the Saints Go Marching In" was adapted by Dick Powell's Four Star Television for its legal drama The Law and Mr. Jones starring James Whitmore, which ran on ABC from 1960 to 1962.
 "When The Saints Go Marching In" was the regimental quick march for the Rhodesian Light Infantry until its disbanding in 1980.
 Dominique, the battalion quick march of the 5th Battalion of the Royal Australian Regiment, has the melody of "When the Saints Go Marching In" adapted in its tune, along with the eponymous 1960s hit, sung by Jeanine Deckers (1933–1985).
 An arrangement of "When the Saints Go Marching In" is the official march of the Hälsinge Wing (F 15) in Sweden.
 Tuts Washington released a version on his 1983 album New Orleans Piano Professor.
 "The Saints Will Never Come" is an instrumental, sped-up and distorted version played in "The Parish", a campaign set in New Orleans of the 2009 videogame Left 4 Dead 2.

See also 
 Communion of saints
 List of pre-1920 jazz standards
 "When the Saints Go Marching In" in sports
 Christian child's prayer § Spirituals

References

External links
"When the Saints Go Marching In"  – Louis Armstrong's version
Hymns Without Words  – free MP3 for download and use in services

Al Hirt songs
Bill Haley songs
Bluebird Records singles
Elvis Presley songs
Fats Domino songs
Gospel songs
American children's songs
Traditional children's songs
James Brown songs
Jazz standards of obscure origin
Jerry Lee Lewis songs
Louis Armstrong songs
Mardi Gras songs
Music of New Orleans
New Orleans Saints
Pace Jubilee Singers songs
Pinky and Perky songs
Songs about New Orleans
The Beatles with Tony Sheridan songs
The Kingston Trio songs
Trini Lopez songs
Military tattoos
African-American spiritual songs
United States National Recording Registry recordings